The Kottenforst is a large forest, about 40 km² in area, to the south, west and north of the city of Bonn in Germany. It is part of the Rhineland Nature Park (1,045 km²) and forms its eastern side.

Geography 
The part of the natural region of Ville, which is not dominated by the brown coal mining of the Rhenish Brown Coal Field, is also called Waldville.

The Kottenforst is divided into a southeastern section between Meckenheim, Bad Godesberg and Bonn, into which areas of natural open country intrude in places, such as the Katzenlochbach Valley, and a northern area between Heimerzheim, Buschhoven and Alfter. Between the two areas lies the village of Witterschlick.

References

Literature 
 Werner D´hein: Kottenforst. 13 Wanderungen durch eine historische Kulturlandschaft. Gaasterland-Verlag, Düsseldorf, 2008, .
 Bruno P. Kremer (also ed.): Der Kottenforst. Eine rheinische Kultur- und Erholungslandschaft. Wienand, Cologne, 1999, .
 Albert Hexges: Der Kottenforst. Ein Beitrag zur Forstgeschichte Kurkölns unter besonderer Berücksichtigung der Entwicklung des Waldeigentums, des Forstrechts, der Forstorganisation und der Waldnutzung. In: Bonner Geschichtsblätter, Band 35. Bonn, 1984, pp. 23–98.
 Gemeinde Swisttal, Heinz Doepgen (ed.): 900 Jahre Heimerzheim. G. Grote'sche Verlagsbuchhandlung, Cologne and Berlin, .
 Arbeitskreis Heimat im Ortsausschuss Heimerzheim (ed.): Heimerzheim im Wandel der Zeiten.

Sources 
 Nature park map 1:50,000 by the State Survey Office of NRW Kottenforst-Ville, and the hiking map of the Eifel Club in cooperation with the forestry office of Kottenforst, 1980 (with description on the reverse side)

External links 

 Geschichte des Kottenforstes
 Der "Eiserne Mann im Kottenforst"

Forests and woodlands of North Rhine-Westphalia
Rhein-Sieg-Kreis
Bonn